Simon Norberg (born February 1, 1996) is a Swedish ice hockey player. He is currently playing with Leksands IF of the Swedish Hockey League (SHL).

Norberg made his Swedish Hockey League debut playing with Leksands IF during the 2014–15 SHL season.

References

External links

1996 births
Living people
Leksands IF players
Swedish ice hockey centres